The 2013–14 season was the 110th season of competitive football in Spain. It started officially 1 July 2013 and ended 30 June 2014.

Competitions dates
La Liga and Segunda División started 17 and 16 August respectively. All competitions stopped during the Christmas holidays between 23 December 2013 and 2 January 2014.

Transfer windows

Retirements
The following players retired from association football at the end of 2012–13 season or during this season, being the last club a member of 2013–14 La Liga or 2013–14 Segunda División:

Promotion and relegation (pre-season)
Teams promoted to 2013–14 La Liga
 Elche CF
 Villarreal CF
 UD Almería

Teams relegated from 2012–13 La Liga
 RCD Mallorca
 Deportivo de La Coruña
 Real Zaragoza

Teams promoted to 2013–14 Segunda División
 Deportivo Alavés
 CD Tenerife
 Real Jaén
 SD Eibar

Teams relegated from 2012–13 Segunda División
 CD Guadalajara
 Racing de Santander
 SD Huesca
 Xerez CD

Teams promoted to 2013–14 Segunda División B

 Racing de Ferrol
 Elche CF Ilicitano
 CD Puerta Bonita
 Burgos CF
 Algeciras CF
 UD Las Palmas Atlético
 La Hoya Lorca CF
 CD Sariñena
 CD Toledo
 Celta de Vigo B
 SD Compostela
 CD Tropezón
 CD Laudio
 UE Olot
 Cultural y Deportiva Leonesa
 CD El Palo
 Granada CF B
 UB Conquense

Teams relegated from 2012–13 Segunda División B

 UD San Sebastián de los Reyes
 RSD Alcalá
 Rayo Vallecano B
 CD Marino
 Gimnástica de Torrelavega (administrative)
 Real Zaragoza B 
 Racing de Santander B
 CD Teruel
 CA Osasuna B
 CD Izarra
 CE Constància (relegation revoked)
 RCD Mallorca B
 Orihuela CF
 Yeclano Deportivo
 CD Binissalem
 CF Villanovense
 UCAM Murcia CF
 Loja CD
 CD San Roque de Lepe
 Real Betis B

Teams dissolved

National team

The home team is on the left column; the away team is on the right column.

FIFA World Cup qualifiers
Spain is in Group I of the 2014 World Cup qualification process.

FIFA World Cup

Friendlies

Spanish friendly tournaments
List of some friendly matches or short tournaments which are celebrating in Spain, mainly at summer as part of pre-season, which participate La Liga and Segunda División teams. Other historical tournaments are also included.

Other unofficial/friendly tournaments 
Other unofficial major tournaments or friendly matches celebrated in Spain are:
 2013–14 Copa Catalunya

Competitions

Trophy and league champions

League tables

La Liga

Segunda División

Cup results

Final bracket

References